Sean Weathers (born January 14, 1980, in Jonestown, Guyana) is an American, New York City based, film director, producer, screenwriter, editor, casting director and actor. Weathers specializes in making  low-budget films primarily in the erotic and horror genres using skeleton crews and guerrilla filmmaking tactics.

Filmography

References

External links

 
Sean Weathers at Rotten Tomatoes

1980 births
Living people
African-American male actors
African-American film directors
African-American screenwriters
Screenwriters from New York (state)
Film producers from New York (state)
American male screenwriters
Male actors from New York City
21st-century American male actors
African-American film producers
American male film actors
Film directors from New York City
Writers from New York City
American experimental filmmakers
Horror film directors
American atheists
American film editors
Blaxploitation film directors
21st-century African-American people
20th-century African-American people
African-American male writers